Petra de Nieva (aka Petrita Nieva) was a prolific Spanish film editor who worked in the industry from the 1940s through the 1970s.

Selected filmography 

 Vote for Gundisalvo (1978)
 Hasta que el matrimonio nos separe (1977)
 Nosotros que fuimos tan felices (1976)
 El asesino está entre los trece (1976)
 La mujer es cosa de hombres (1976)
 El mejor regalo (1975)
 El insólito embarazo de los Martínez (1974)
 The New Spaniards (1974)
 Tocata y fuga de Lolita (1974)
 Con la música a otra parte (1974)
 The Ghost Galleon (1974)
 Señora doctor (1974)
 Vida conyugal sana (1974)
 La llamaban La Madrina (1973)
 Count Dracula's Great Love (1973)
 Hunchback of the Morgue (1973)
 Soltero y padre en la vida (1972)
 El triangulito (1972)
 Dr. Jekyll vs. The Werewolf (1972)
 Ligue Story (1972)
 Españolas en París (1971)
 Pierna creciente, falda menguante (1970)
 El monumento (1970)
 Unmarried and Mother in Life (1969)
 La que arman las mujeres (1969)
 The Wanton of Spain (1969)
 Adiós cordera (1969)
 Una vez al año ser hippy no hace daño (1969)
 La dinamita está servida (1968)
 Los que tocan el piano (1968)
 Los subdesarrollados (1968)
 Un diablo bajo la almohada (1968)
 Las que tienen que servir (1967)
 La Barrera (1966)
 Mission Bloody Mary (1965)
 El pecador y la bruja (1964)
 Tengo 17 años (1964)
 The Adventures of Scaramouche (1963)
 ¿Chico o chica? (1962)
 De la piel del diablo (1962)
 Bello recuerdo (1961)
 Los dos golfillos (1961)
 El pequeño coronel (1960)
 El amor que yo te di (1960)
 Escucha mi canción (1959)
 Saeta del ruiseñor (1959)
 El ruiseñor de las cumbres (1958)
 El sol sale todos los días (1958)
 El pequeño ruiseñor (1957)
 La legión del silencio (1956)
 Retorno a la verdad (1956)
 Encuentro en la ciudad (1956)
 Un día perdido (1955)
 Summer's Clouds (1955)
 Tangier Assignment (1955)
 Brindis al cielo (1954)
 María Dolores (1953)
 Dawn of America (1951)
 The Lioness of Castille (1951)
 The Siege (1950)
 Trifles (1950)
 Siempre vuelven de madrugada (1949)
 Confidencia (1948)
 Alhucemas (1948)
 La Lola se va a los puertos (1947)
 Dos mujeres y un rostro (1947)
 Spanish Serenade (1947)
 Cero en conducta (1945)
 Con los ojos del alma (1943)
 Goyescas (1941)

References 

Spanish film editors
Spanish women film editors